Sacajawea Park is a public park in northeast Portland, Oregon's Cully neighborhood, in the United States. Managed by Portland Parks & Recreation, the  park was acquired in 1985 and has an off-leash area.

In 2013, approximately 30 volunteers renovated the park in partnership with the Portland Trail Blazers and Banfield Pet Hospital.

References

External links

 

1985 establishments in Oregon
Cully, Portland, Oregon
Parks in Portland, Oregon